The Theodore Ministry was the 28th ministry of the Government of Queensland and was led by Premier Ted Theodore of the Labor Party. It succeeded the Ryan Ministry on 22 October 1919 following T. J. Ryan's resignation from the Queensland parliament to run for federal politics, and was in turn succeeded by the Gillies Ministry on 26 February 1925 when Theodore followed his predecessor into federal politics.

First Ministry
On 22 October 1919, the Governor, Sir Hamilton Goold-Adams, designated eight principal executive offices of the Government, and appointed the following Members of the Parliament of Queensland to the Ministry.

Second Ministry
The ministry was reconstituted on 12 November 1920 following the 1920 election.

Third Ministry

On 2 July 1923, the Governor, Sir Matthew Nathan, designated nine principal executive offices of the Government, and appointed the following Members of the Parliament of Queensland to the Ministry.

References
 
 
 
 
 

Queensland ministries
Australian Labor Party ministries in Queensland